Browns Branch is a stream in Franklin County in the U.S. state of Missouri. It is a tributary of Dubois Creek.
 
Browns Branch has the name of a pioneer citizen.

See also
List of rivers of Missouri

References

Rivers of Franklin County, Missouri
Rivers of Missouri